XEXN-AM is a radio station on 1010 AM in Ures, Sonora. It is owned by the successors of Francisco Vidal Esquer and known as Radio Ures.

History
XEXN received its concession on November 25, 1969.

In 2019, Grupo Larsa Comunicaciones began operating the station with its Toño format, ending 50 years as Radio Ures.
And dropped Toño and resuming to returned to Radio Ures.

References

External links
 Radio Ures Facebook

Radio stations in Sonora
 Radio stations established in 1969